Nineveh-Hensley-Jackson United School Corporation, also known as Indian Creek Schools, is a school district headquartered in Trafalgar, Indiana. The district serves Trafalgar, Morgantown, Nineveh and Princes Lakes, in portions of Johnson, and Morgan Counties.

Schools
Indian Creek Elementary School
Indian Creek Intermediate School
Indian Creek Middle School
Indian Creek High School

References

External links
 Nineveh-Hensley-Jackson United School Corporation

School districts in Indiana
Education in Johnson County, Indiana